Jean-Marc Lefranc (born February 20, 1947 in Grandcamp-Maisy) was a member of the National Assembly of France from 2002 to 2012.  He represented the Calvados department,  and is a member of the Union for a Popular Movement.

References

1947 births
Living people
People from Calvados (department)
Politicians from Normandy
Union for a Popular Movement politicians
Deputies of the 12th National Assembly of the French Fifth Republic
Deputies of the 13th National Assembly of the French Fifth Republic